Ingrid I. Rivera Rocafort is a marketing professional and the current Executive Director of the Puerto Rico Tourism Company. She has worked as a market analyst, strategic planner, and Director of such firms as Procter & Gamble, Wal-Mart, and Advent-Morro Equity Partners coordinating efforts in Puerto Rico and for Spanish-speaking markets throughout the Caribbean and United States. She also is a public speaker on topics related to travel and business.

Biography
Rivera has a bachelor's degree in business administration from the University of Puerto Rico, Río Piedras Campus with a specialty in Marketing. In 1980, she began working for Procter & Gamble and worked her way up to director of external relations in the Multicultural Division, where she was responsible for product positioning throughout the Caribbean, Puerto Rico, and for the US Hispanic market. After  26 years she took retirement in 2006 and founded and acted as president of Rive Consulting Corporation, simultaneously serving on the external advisory board for Wal-Mart US until 2008. Rivera joined Advent-Morro Equity Partners as director in 2010. She headed investor relations, of the venture capital, private equity firm which involved strategic planning and analysis for venture capitalists interested in Puerto Rican start-ups or those in the US Latino market.

In 2012 Rivera was tapped by Puerto Rican governor Alejandro García Padilla to serve as the executive director of the Puerto Rico Tourism Company (PRTC). In her confirmation hearings, she was supported for her experience and business acumen from the former director of the Tourism Company, Terestella González; the president of the Convention Center, Milton Segarra; and the director of the Industrialists Association of Puerto Rico and was unanimously confirmed by the Senate.

In her capacity as the executive director of the PRTC, she is able to make decisions regarding the tourism marketplace without being swayed by partisan politics in the country. In addition, PRTC provides business owners with education about new regulations and laws regarding tourism and casinos.

After confirmation, Rivera had developed a plan for growing Puerto Rico's tourism sector from 6% to 8% of the gross domestic product (GDP) for the island by 2016, utilizing market analysis and evaluation of air traffic routes, among other factors. Despite economic problems in Puerto Rico, the tourism industry has remained stable under Riveras direction through 2015, though growth has not increased in all sectors. Some sectors, like the cruise ship sector have seen increases of over 25% while others, like the convention sector and casino segment are struggling. Rivera has worked with the cruise industry to increase the number of ships stopping at the port of San Juan. Rivera has developed marketing strategies like partnerships with the Golf Channel to pinpoint beneficial relationships rather than widespread coverage in traditional television marketing and through legislation to address infrastructure and incentive shortfalls. In March, 2015, Rivera's work was recognized by the First Lady of Puerto Rico, Wilma Pastrana as one of the outstanding women in public service in Puerto Rico.

In addition to her business work, Rivera is also involved in non-profit service, being an active member of the New America Alliance, Since 1995, he has been part of the board of directors of the YMCA in San Juan and the P&G Alumni Network serving as a board member.

References

Officials of Puerto Rico
University of Puerto Rico alumni
Living people
Year of birth missing (living people)
Procter & Gamble people
Puerto Rican women in business